Scott A. Mosier (born March 5, 1971) is an American film producer, director and editor best known for his work with director Kevin Smith, with whom he occasionally co-hosts the weekly podcast, SModcast.

Early life 
Mosier was born in Vancouver, Washington, and moved around as a child between British Columbia and Washington. He has dual Canadian and American citizenship, as his father John was born in Saskatchewan, Canada. As a teenager he resided in Vancouver, British Columbia.

Mosier met Kevin Smith while both were attending Vancouver Film School in Canada. Their first assignment, Mae Day: The Crumbling of a Documentary, was a student film documentary that fell apart in production. To salvage it, Smith and Mosier interviewed the crew about the demise of the very documentary that they had been attempting to produce. They also added a segment in which the two were shown in silhouette as they described their fictional thoughts.

Four months into the eight-month program, Smith decided to drop out, but not before making a deal with Mosier: each would start writing a script of his own, and the one who finished last would help the other with his film.

Career

View Askew 
On Smith's first feature film, Clerks, Mosier recorded the original sound on set, edited the film (at RST Video), and contributed to the budget. He also contributed by appearing on-screen as multiple characters, including the angry hockey player and Willam Black (Snowball).

On 1995 film Mallrats, Mosier worked in organizing the budget along with line producer Laura Greenlee, while presiding over a much larger crew. In the film, he portrayed Svenning's assistant, Roddy. The character later appeared on a Jay and Silent Bob MTV short.

On the 1997 romantic comedy film Chasing Amy, Mosier and Smith agreed with Miramax's Harvey Weinstein and Bob Weinstein to shrink the initial proposed budget from $3 million to $250,000. The compromise allowed Mosier and Kevin to cast their friends instead of established stars. Mosier appears in the beginning of the film as the comics convention patron who gets into an argument with Banky Edwards (Jason Lee) after demeaning his career as a tracer.

On the 1999 film Dogma, Mosier worked with Greenlee again; the editing of the film lasted nearly a year. He also played the Smooching Seaman who Ben Affleck and Matt Damon meet on the bus.

On the 2001 film Jay and Silent Bob Strike Back, Mosier worked with a budget of $20 million. The editing was difficult, due to the MPAA threatening to give the film an NC-17 rating. In the film, Mosier played the assistant director on the set of the fictional sequel to Good Will Hunting and reprises his Willam Black character from Clerks.

Mosier had a comparatively larger budget to work with on the film Jersey Girl, at $35 million. The editing was also difficult due to the studio's desire to cut a large amount of Jennifer Lopez footage with Ben Affleck following the poor box-office performance of Gigli.

Mosier produced Clerks II in 2006. Smith stated he edited the film himself, making Clerks II one of three films Mosier has produced with Smith, but not edited (the others being Mallrats and Zack and Miri Make a Porno). Mosier makes a brief cameo as a concerned father who shields his daughter's eyes from the sight of a character sitting on a toilet.

In 2008, Mosier worked again with Smith as the producer on Zack and Miri Make a Porno.

Other work 
Mosier served as an executive producer, editor, and actor for Bryan Johnson's Vulgar, an Askew production. He had also served as a producer (along with Smith) on Drawing Flies, A Better Place, and Clerks: The Animated Series; he served as a co-executive producer on Good Will Hunting and Big Helium Dog. He also appeared in cameos in Drawing Flies as the Crying Diaperman, in A Better Place as Larry, and in Vulgar as Scotty. Although he barely recorded any episodes in 2017, Mosier is also a co-host, along with Smith, of the SModcast podcast hosted by the Smith-owned SModcast.com.

In 2007, Salim Baba, a short documentary Mosier produced, was nominated for an Academy Award. Filmmakers Tim Sternberg and Francisco Bello received the nomination (Mosier was unable to be nominated due to a limit of two nominees per short film).

On SModcast 77, Mosier announced he would not produce Smith's film Cop Out (2010), instead pursuing his directorial debut. He stated on SModcast 90 that he finished writing his first feature screenplay and was in the process of trying to sell it.

On August 10, 2011, Mosier stated on Twitter that he has written some episodes of the Ultimate Spider-Man cartoon on Disney. This was confirmed in a special "SModcast Extra" (attached to SModcast No. 204 and episode 5 of the Comic Book Men podcast "Secret Stash") in which he and Smith interview Joe Casey; Mosier has written six scripts for the series.

Mosier made his directorial debut with Illumination Entertainment's animated feature The Grinch, based on the book by Dr. Seuss, and co-directed with Yarrow Cheney. It was released on November 9, 2018.

Personal life 
Mosier was personally involved with fellow producer Monica Hampton for a while, whom he met while the two were producing Vulgar. He married girlfriend Alex Hilebronner on September 1, 2006. The couple met on the set of Jersey Girl.

In the documentary Back to the Well: Clerks II, he states that he is agnostic, but has gone to church with Kevin Smith on occasion.

Filmography

References

External links 
 
 Mae Day Scott Mosier's first film, a documentary shot while in film school

1971 births
20th-century American businesspeople
21st-century American businesspeople
21st-century American screenwriters
21st-century Canadian screenwriters
American podcasters
American animated film directors
American male voice actors
Canadian male voice actors
Canadian animated film directors
Canadian film editors
Film producers from British Columbia
Living people
People from Coquitlam
Writers from Vancouver, Washington
View Askewniverse
Film directors from Washington (state)
Film producers from Washington (state)
Kevin Smith
American film editors
Vancouver Film School alumni